OneKind is a campaigning animal welfare charity based in Edinburgh and operating in Scotland, UK and as part of the Eurogroup for Animals. OneKind exists to end cruelty to all animals and improve their lives.

Background 
The organisation was founded as the Scottish Society for the Prevention of Vivisection, in 1911 by Netta and Elizabeth Ivory. It continues to work towards an end to animal experimentation but in the 1950s expanded to include protection of all types of animal. It was renamed Advocates for Animals in 1990, as part of a rebranding campaign that included a new logo, but officially became known as OneKind in 2010. The group is currently run by Director Bob Elliot.

Wild animal welfare 

In 2011, OneKind set up the SnareWatch website.

Another issue OneKind works on is fox hunting. OneKind is a member of the REVIVE coalition for grouse moor reform.

Farmed animal welfare 
OneKind promotes compassionate dietary choices and works to improve the lives of farmed animals by campaigning to end practices such as live exports, the caging of farmed animals, and intensive animal farming.

Companion animal welfare 
In 2014 OneKind published the Pet Origins report,

References

External links

1911 establishments in Scotland
Animal welfare organisations based in the United Kingdom
Animals in Scotland
Anti-vivisection organizations
Charities based in Scotland
Organisations based in Edinburgh
Organizations established in 1911